The Central Bank of Syria (CBS) is the central bank of Syria. The bank was established in 1953 and started operations in 1956. Its headquarters are in Damascus, with 11 branches in the provincial capitals. The objective of the bank is "to foster the stability, integrity and efficiency of the nation’s financial and payment systems so as to promote optimal macro economic performance".

The CBS issues Syria's currency, the Syrian pound (LS), and sets the intervention price in the foreign currency market for the Syrian pound on a daily basis. The CBS exercises control over all banks operating in Syria.

History 
At independence, French- and British-owned banks dominated banking activity in Syria. The largest bank, the French-owned Banque de Syrie et du Liban (Bank of Syria and Lebanon), assumed central bank functions and became the bank of currency issue, in addition to its commercial operations. Syria joined the International Monetary Fund (IMF) on April 10, 1947 and fixed the exchange rate at £S 2.19 to US$1.

The law to establish the Central Bank of Syria was passed in 1953, but the bank did not operate until 1956. Its functions included issuing notes, controlling the money supply, acting as fiscal agent for the government, and controlling credit and commercial banks. It was also to act as the country's development bank until specialized banks were established for various sectors. The Central Bank had considerable discretionary powers over the banking system but was itself responsible to and under the control of the Council on Money and Credit, a policy group of high-ranking officials.

After the 1956 Suez War, French and British banking interests were seized as enemy assets. In 1958, and after the union with Egypt, the state began to Arabize the commercial banking system and in 1961 implemented a policy of limited nationalization.

In 1966, the state nationalised all commercial banking, merging all existing commercial banks into a single consolidated Commercial Bank of Syria. The government also created specialized banks to promote economic development.

International sanctions
The United States has imposed sanctions against the Central Bank of Syria since May 2004, under Section 311 of the Patriot Act, with the Bank being accused of money laundering. The sanctions shut Syria out of the global financial system. To circumvent the sanctions, Syrians effect foreign transactions through banks in neighbouring countries, especially Lebanon, but making them vulnerable to economic disruptions in those countries.

Because of the government's actions in the Syrian Civil War, the U.S., Canada, EU, Arab League and Turkey have all imposed sanctions on Syria, including the Syrian Central Bank. The Syrian Central Bank has been actively trying to undermine these various sanctions, with bank officials meeting friendly institutions such as Gazprombank executives in Moscow in March 2012. The Bank has taken an increasingly clandestine role in the domestic private sector as the country's failing economy has deterred foreign investment.

On 23 December 2020, the US Department of the Treasury's Office of Foreign Assets Control (OFAC) sanctioned the Central Bank of Syria along with nine other entities and seven individuals, due to their role during the Syrian Civil War.

Gold reserves
In April 2012, Reuters reported that since the outbreak of the Syrian Civil War in 2011, Syria's gold reserves have been cut in half from the pre-civil war level of about $17 billion, with the Syrian government using the reserves to cope with international sanctions. The Governor of the Central Bank Adib Mayalah has sought to deny these reports. This is similar to how the Syrian government is using its foreign reserves to meet the demands of a budget deficit which has greatly increased to about US$6.7 billion.

Attacks on bank
Since the start of the Syrian Civil War, the Central Bank building was attacked three times: in April 2012 a rocket-propelled grenade was fired at the building; in April 2013 it was affected by a car bombing nearby; and in October 2013 it was hit by mortar shells.

Governors
 Izzat Traboulsi (1956–1961)
 Hosni Al Sawaf (1961–1963)
 Nourallah Nourallah (1963–1963)
 Adnan Al Farra (1963–1970)
 Nasouh Al Dakkak (1971–1978)
 Rifaat Al Akkad (1978–1984)
 Hisham Mutawalli (1984–1987)
 Mohammad Al Sharif (1987–1995)
 Mohammad Bashar Kabbarah (1995–2004)
 Adib Mayaleh (2005–2016)
 Duraid Durgam (2016–2018)
 Hazem Karfoul (2018–2021)
 Mohammed Issam Hazima (2021–present)

See also

 Ministry of Finance (Syria)
 Banking in Syria
 Economy of Syria
 Syrian pound

References

External links

 

Economy of Syria
Syria
Banks of Syria
Buildings and structures in Damascus
Banks established in 1953